This is a list of the equipment currently used by the Cameroon Army.

Infantry weapons

Vehicles

Armored vehicles

Unarmored vehicles

Artillery

Air defence

Radars

References

Cameroon
Military of Cameroon